Rõstla is a village in Põltsamaa Parish, Jõgeva County in eastern Estonia.

References

Villages in Jõgeva County